John Bird is a Welsh former professional footballer. A full back, he joined Newport County in 1957. He went on to make 277 appearances for Newport, scoring 4 goals. In 1967, he joined Swansea Town.

He subsequently played with Merthyr Tydfil, Caerau and was player-manager at Pontyclun.

References

External links

Welsh footballers
Newport County A.F.C. players
Swansea City A.F.C. players
English Football League players
Living people
1940 births
Footballers from Cardiff
Association football fullbacks
Hereford United F.C. players
Merthyr Tydfil F.C. players